was a Japanese composer.

Hirota was born in Aki, Kōchi.

Works, editions and recordings
 Komoro-naru kojo no hotori (小諸なる古城のほとり "In the old castle in Komoro") Recording Kazumichi Ohno (tenor), Kyosuke Kobayashi (piano)
 "Hamachidori" (Beach Plover). Jean-Pierre Rampal (flute), Ensemble Lunaire. Japanese Folk Melodies transcribed by Akio Yashiro, CBS Records, 1978.

References

1892 births
1952 deaths
20th-century Japanese composers
Musicians from Kōchi Prefecture
People from Kōchi Prefecture